Swirskiseius is a genus of mites in the Phytoseiidae family.

Species
 Swirskiseius zamoranus Denmark & Evans, in Denmark, Evans, Aguilar, Vargas & Ochoa 1999

References

Phytoseiidae